Rigio is a village in the eastern part of Didymoteicho municipality, Evros regional unit, Greece. It is 13 km east of the centre of Didymoteicho, on the right bank of the river Evros, where it forms the border with Turkey. Rigio belongs to the community of Pythio.
The nearest villages are Pythio to the south, Asimenio to the west and Sofiko to the northwest.
The town is populated by Arvanites.

Sites of interest
 Ancient Tombs, 4th century BC

See also
 List of settlements in the Evros regional unit

References

External links
 

Didymoteicho
Populated places in Evros (regional unit)
Albanian communities of Western Thrace